The finals and the qualifying heats of the Women's 100 metres Freestyle event at the 1997 FINA Short Course World Championships were held on the first day of the competition, on Thursday 17 April 1997 in Gothenburg, Sweden.

Finals

Qualifying heats

See also
1996 Women's Olympic Games 100m Freestyle
1997 Women's European LC Championships 100m Freestyle

References
 Results

F
1997 in women's swimming